Vidyananthan a/l Ramanadhan is a Malaysian politician who served as Chairman of the Unity and Human Resources of Johor in the Barisan Nasional (BN) state administration under former Menteri Besar Hasni Mohammad from March 2020 to March 2022 and Chairman of the Health and Environment Committee of Johor in the BN state administration under former Menteri Besar Mohamed Khaled Nordin from May 2013 to the collapse of the BN state administration in May 2018. He has served as Member of the Johor State Legislative Assembly (MLA) for Kahang since March 2008. He is a member and State Chairman of Johor of the Malaysian Indian Congress (MIC), a component party of the ruling BN coalition.

Personal life

Death of father 
In the morning of 10 July 2022, the father of Vidyananthan namely D. Ramanadhan passed away at the age of 79 at Batu Pahat Hospital, Johor due to old age and leaving behind two children including Vidyananthan and two grandchildren. Ramanadhan is the former senior assistant of SK Pendidikan Khas Princess Elizabeth Johor Baru and former headmaster of SKPK St Nicholas Penang and SKPK Alma Penang. The funeral rites for Ramanadhan were held at Jalan Azizul Rahman, Kamunting in Taiping, Perak at 2 pm the next day on 11 July 2022. His remains were cremated at the Prestavest Memorial Park Taiping on the same day.

Election results

References 

Living people
People from Johor
Malaysian people of Malay descent
Malaysian Muslims
United Malays National Organisation politicians
21st-century Malaysian politicians
Year of birth missing (living people)